Robert Brannan  was an English professional footballer who played as a winger.

Career
Born in Bradford, Brannan played for Bradford City and Scarborough. For Bradford City, he made 11 appearances in the Football League, scoring 2 goals; he also made 1 appearance in the FA Cup. Brannon died in 1986.

Sources

References

1924 births
1986 deaths
English footballers
Bradford City A.F.C. players
Scarborough F.C. players
English Football League players
Association football wingers